Omiodes monogramma is a moth of the family Crambidae. It is endemic to the Hawaiian islands of Kauai, Oahu, Molokai and Hawaii.

The larvae feed on Dianella odorata. They feed on the leaves, which they fold together along the midrib and fasten with silk at the margins. Usually there is one caterpillar per leaf. Young larvae begin feeding at the apex of the leaf, and then they gradually work downward, folding together more and more of the leaf as they need it for a hiding place. The surface and substance of the leaf are eaten, leaving the outer epidermis (which is left intact) in a dried up condition enclosing the accumulation of frass. Full-grown larvae are 20–22 mm long and pale yellowish green.

Pupation takes place in a slight cocoon where the caterpillar has finished eating. The pupa is 12–14 mm long and very pale uniform brownish. The pupal period lasts 12–14 days.

External links

Moths described in 1899
Endemic moths of Hawaii
monogramma